The 1981 Iowa Hawkeyes football team represented the University of Iowa in the 1981 Big Ten Conference football season. The Hawks were 6–2 in conference play and were Big Ten Conference co-champions. Iowa went to the Rose Bowl for the first time in 23 years. Their previous appearance in the 1958 season, when Iowa won the 1959 Rose Bowl. This time Iowa had a more difficult time, shutout by Don James's Washington Huskies, 28–0. It was also Iowa's first winning season since 1961. The Hawkeyes finished the 1981 season at 8–4.

Several Iowa players ranked among the Big Ten leaders, including the following:
 Lou King led the conference with eight interceptions.
 Phil Blatcher ranked fourth in the conference with 708 rushing yards. 
 Tom Nichol ranked fourth in the conference with 11 field goals made.
 Jeff Brown ranked fourth in the conference with 137 punt return yards and 6.5 yards per punt return.
 Quarterback Gordy Bohannon ranked 10th in the conference with 1,303 total yards.

Schedule

In 1981, Iowa played eight conference games, missing one opponent. The government of Iowa mandated that they resume their series with Iowa State.  Iowa did not play Ohio State in 1981; OSU was also 8-3 and 6-2 in the Big Ten to tie for the conference title.  The Buckeyes won their bowl game, the 1981 Liberty Bowl over Navy, and finished at 9-3.

Roster

Rankings

Game summaries

Nebraska

Sources: Box Score

at Iowa State

Sources: Box Score and Game Story

UCLA

Sources: Box Score

at Northwestern 

Sources: Box Score and Game Story

Indiana

Sources: Box Score

at Michigan

Sources: Box Score and Game Story
    
    
    
    

The Hawkeyes won 9-7 at #5 Michigan, their third victory over a top ten team during the 1981 season. It was Iowa's first victory over the Wolverines since 1962.

Minnesota

Sources: Box Score and Game Story

at Illinois

Sources: Box Score and Game Story

Purdue

Sources: Box Score and Game Story
    
    
    
    
    
    
    

The 33-7 win was Iowa's first over the Boilermakers since 1960, and secured the Hawkeyes' first winning season since 1961.

at Wisconsin

Sources: Box Score and Game Story

Michigan State

Sources: Box Score and Game Story
    
    
    
    
    
    
    
    

Iowa earns first Rose Bowl since 1958 with Michigan's loss to Ohio State, which was announced with 6:14 left in the first quarter.

Statistics
Phil Blatcher 27 Rush, 247 Yds

vs. Washington (Rose Bowl)

Sources:

Postseason Awards
Hayden Fry – Big Ten Coach of the Year
Andre Tippett – Consensus first-team All-American (Defensive end)
Reggie Roby – Consensus first-team All-American (Punter), NCAA single-season record with a 49.8-yard average

Team players in 1982 NFL Draft

References

Iowa
Iowa Hawkeyes football seasons
Big Ten Conference football champion seasons
Iowa Hawkeyes football